Tallcree 173, also known as South Tallcree, is an Indian reserve of the Tallcree First Nation in Alberta, located within Mackenzie County. In the 2016 Canadian Census, it recorded a population of 250 living in 51 of its 53 total private dwellings.

References

Indian reserves in Alberta